Minuscule 467 (in the Gregory-Aland numbering), α 502 (in the Soden numbering), is a Greek minuscule manuscript of the New Testament, on paper. Palaeographically it has been assigned to the 15th century. 
The manuscript has complex contents. Formerly it was labelled by 116a, 136p, and 53r.

Description 

The codex contains the text of the whole New Testaments except Gospels on 331 paper leaves (size ). The text is written in one column per page, 21 lines per page.

It has scholia to the Catholic epistles.

The order of books: Acts of the Apostles, Catholic epistles, Pauline epistles, and Book of Revelation.

Text 

The Greek text of the codex is mixed with strong the Byzantine element. Aland placed it in Category III in Pauline epistles. In rest of books it has lower value.

In Acts 8:39 instead of πνεῦμα κυρίου (spirit of the Lord) it has unusual textual variant  (the Holy Spirit fell on the eunuch, and an angel of the Lord caught up Philip) supported by Codex Alexandrinus and several minuscule manuscripts: 94, 103, 307, 322, 323, 385, 453, 945, 1739, 1765, 1891, 2298, 36a, itp, vg, syrh.

History 

The manuscript was written by George Hermonymus. Probably it was held in Claromontanus (?) It once belonged to Le Teller, bishop of Rheims, as first manuscript of his collection (in the 16th century).

The manuscript was slightly examined and described by Scholz, Paulin Martin, and C. R. Gregory (1885). Herman C. Hoskier examined and collated its text in the Book of Revelation.

It was added to the list of New Testament manuscripts by Scholz. 
Formerly it was labelled by 116a, 136p, and 53r. In 1908 Gregory gave the number 467 to it.

It is currently housed at the Bibliothèque nationale de France (Gr. 59) in Paris.

See also 

 List of New Testament minuscules
 Biblical manuscript
 Textual criticism

References

Further reading 

 Herman C. Hoskier, Concerning the Text of the Apocalypse (1 vol., London, 1929), pp. 162–165.

External links 
 

Greek New Testament minuscules
15th-century biblical manuscripts
Bibliothèque nationale de France collections